Carlton S. Rose (February 8, 1962 - March 26, 2006) was an American football player.  He played college football as a linebacker at the University of Michigan from 1980 to 1983.  He played professional football as a linebacker in the United States Football League (USFL) in 1984 and 1985 and in the National Football League for the Washington Redskins as a linebacker and during the 1987 NFL strike.

Early years
Rose was born in Pompano Beach, Florida, in 1962.  He attended Stranahan High School in Ft. Lauderdale, Florida.

University of Michigan
Rose enrolled at the University of Michigan in 1980 and played college football for Bo Schembechler's Michigan Wolverines football teams from 1980 to 1983.  As a junior, he started 11 games at outside linebacker for the 1982 Michigan Wolverines football team.  As a senior, he started six games at outside linebacker and won the 1983 Dick Katcher Award.  He was selected by the conference coaches as a second-team linebacker on the 1983 All-Big Ten Conference football team.

Professional football
After graduating from Michigan, Rose played professional football in the United States Football League (USFL) for the Michigan Panthers in 1984 and Los Angeles Express in 1985 and in the Canadian Football League (CFL) for the Ottawa Rough Riders.  He also played two games in the National Football League (NFL) for the Washington Redskins as a replacement player during the 1987 NFL strike.

Later years
Rose died of a stroke in 2006 at age 44.

References

1962 births
2006 deaths
American football linebackers
Washington Redskins players
People from Pompano Beach, Florida
Michigan Wolverines football players
National Football League replacement players
Sportspeople from Broward County, Florida
Los Angeles Express players
Michigan Panthers players
Players of American football from Fort Lauderdale, Florida